Clarkia affinis is a species of wildflower known as chaparral clarkia. It is endemic to California, where it grows mainly on chaparral slopes and woodlands in the Coast Ranges. This is a spindly plant producing erect stems exceeding half a meter in height and sparse narrow leaves. The flower is a bowl-shaped bloom with four pink or red petals each 5 to 15 millimeters long. The petals may have darker spots near the base and purple or red speckling.

References

External links
Jepson Manual Profile
Photo gallery

affinis
Endemic flora of California
Plants described in 1953